Saunders School, located at 415 North 41st Avenue in the Midtown area of Omaha, Nebraska, United States, was declared a landmark by the City of Omaha in 1985, and listed on the National Register of Historic Places in 1986.

About
Named for Alvin Saunders, Nebraska's last territorial governor and a member of the Board of Regents of Omaha High School, Saunders School was built in the Romanesque style in 1899. It was designed by prominent Omaha architect John Latenser, Sr. to reflect his interest in neo-classical form and detail. It was the first commission Latenser received among many for Omaha's civic and commercial buildings.  

The school's roof was torn off and the building was partially destroyed by the Easter Sunday Tornado of 1913.

After operating as a school for more than 80 years, the two-story brick building was renovated for use as apartments in the late 1980s.

See also
History of Omaha

References

Landmarks in North Omaha, Nebraska
Schools in North Omaha, Nebraska
History of North Omaha, Nebraska
National Register of Historic Places in Omaha, Nebraska
Defunct schools in Omaha, Nebraska
Apartment buildings in Omaha, Nebraska
John Latenser Sr. buildings
School buildings on the National Register of Historic Places in Nebraska
1899 establishments in Nebraska
School buildings completed in 1899